Richard Nevill (1654–1720) was an Irish politician.

He was the eldest son of Richard Nevill and hs wife Margaret Ussher. He inherited the country house of Furness, where he afterwards lived, on the death of his father in 1682.

In 1692 he was elected Sovereign of Naas (i.e. Mayor of the town) and appointed High Sheriff of Kildare. He became Recorder of Naas.

Nevill represented Naas in the Irish House of Commons between 1695 and 1703.

On his death in 1720 Furness passed to Richard Nevill, an Army Officer.

References

1654 births
1720 deaths
Irish MPs 1695–1699
Politicians from County Kildare
High Sheriffs of Kildare
Members of the Parliament of Ireland (pre-1801) for County Kildare constituencies